Recreational Aviation Australia (abbreviated to RAA or RAAus), formerly known as the Australian Ultralight Federation (AUF), is the governing body for ultralights in Australia.

RAAus registers ultralight aircraft and issues pilot certificates through 170 approved flight training facilities under a delegation from the nation's aviation regulator, the Civil Aviation Safety Authority.

Mission
RAAus' stated mission is:

"Accessible, safe aviation for all by being an industry leader in developing sport and recreational aviation for the fun and enjoyment of our members"

Membership
As of 24 September 2020 RAAus had just under 10,000 voting members and almost 3,500 aircraft registered.

See also
List of RA-Aus certified aircraft types

References

External links
Official web site

Aviation in Australia
Ultralight aviation
Civil aviation authorities in Oceania
Regulatory authorities of Australia